In Islamic tradition, Al-Nadr was the ancestor of the Islamic prophet Muhammad. He precedes Muhammad by 13 generations.

Ancestry
The tradition (the version of Ibn Ishaq) holds that "Muhammad was the son of 'Abdullah, b. 'Abdu'I-Muttalib (whose name was Shayba), b. Hashim (whose name was 'Amr), b. 'Abd Manaf (whose name was al-Mughira), b. Qusay (whose name was Zayd), b. Kilab, b. Murra, b. Ka'b, b. Lu'ay, b. Ghalib, b. Fihr, b. Malik, b. aI-Nadr, b. Kinana, b. Khuzayma, b. Mudrika (whose name was 'Amir), b.Ilyas , b. Mudar, b. Nizar, b. Ma'add, b. Adnan, b. Udd (or Udad),....   b. Ya'rub, b. Yashjub, b. Nabit, b. Isma'il b. Ibrahim, al-Khalil of the Compassionate."

Family
His father Kinana had four sons: al-Nadr, Malik, 'Abdu Manat, and Milkan.
Nadr's mother was Barra d. Murr b. Udd b. Tabikha b. al-Yas b. Mudar; the other sons were by another woman.

Quraysh

It is also said that Quraysh tribe got their name from their gathering Nadr to his brothers after they had been separated, for gathering together may be expressed by taqarrush.

References

Ancestors of Muhammad
Quraysh
2nd-century Arabs